The 2013 FIBA Asia Championship for Men was the intercontinental championship for basketball organized by FIBA Asia that served as the qualifying tournament for the 2014 FIBA Basketball World Cup in Spain. The tournament was held from August 1–11 in Metro Manila, Philippines. Beirut, Lebanon was supposed to host the tournament but the hosting rights was given to the Philippines citing the Syrian Civil War and security concerns in the Middle East in general. This was also the last Asian Championships that served as the qualifying round for the FIBA Basketball World Cup, as a qualifying window was used starting 2019.

Hosting
During the 2012 FIBA Asia Cup in Japan, FIBA Asia accepted the bids of the Philippines, Lebanon and Iran to host the 2013 FIBA Asia Championship. The Philippines' bid, which was presented by Samahang Basketbol ng Pilipinas (SBP; the national basketball federation) president Manuel V. Pangilinan, SBP secretary-general Sonny Barrios, Philippine Basketball Association commissioner Chito Salud and former FIBA Asia secretary general Moying Materlino, included hosting the games at the newly constructed Mall of Asia Arena. The Lebanese bid was presented by national team player Fadi El Khatib, which was a 10-minute video demonstration of the venues, of which Ghazir Club Court would be the primary arena. The FIBA Asia Executive Committee awarded the tournament to Lebanon, which shall be hosting its first championship.

Beirut was the host of the 2012 FIBA Asia Champions Cup, the Asian club championship. However, the final between Lebanese club Al-Riyadi and Mahram Tehran was put off due to political tension in the city. In a statement, FIBA Asia secretary general Hagop Khajirian said that "FIBA Asia will take a decision on holding the Final Game of the event very soon".

However, with the escalating Syrian civil war, FIBA Asia announced in January 2013 that they shall move the championship to the Philippines, after the SBP expressed willingly to still host the event. This would be the first time in 40 years that the Philippines hosted the championship.

Qualification 

According to the FIBA Asia rules, the host nation Philippines and 2012 FIBA Asia Cup champions Iran automatically qualified. East Asia, West Asia, Southeast Asia, and the Gulf each had two berths while Central Asia and South Asia each had one slot allotted. The other four places are allocated to the zones according to performance in the 2012 FIBA Asia Cup. Therefore, with Japan, Qatar, China, and Chinese Taipei finishing in the top four in that tournament other than Iran and Philippines which were both direct qualifiers, East Asia gained another three berths while the Persian Gulf gained an additional slot.

Included are the teams' FIBA World Rankings prior to the tournament.

Among teams that participated in 2011, Uzbekistan and Indonesia failed to qualify, and Syria did not participate. Returnees include Kazakhstan, which skipped the 2011 tournament after finishing ninth in 2009, Saudi Arabia, which failed to qualify in 2009 and last participated in 2005, Thailand, which last participated in 2001, and Hong Kong, which returned after failing to qualify in 2009 and 2011.

Suspension of the Lebanese federation
Lebanon originally qualified for the tournament after placing second in the 2013 West Asian Basketball Championship. However, after the country's basketball federation was suspended indefinitely by FIBA due to unresolved conflicts within the country's national basketball federation, they were replaced by fourth-placer Iraq, who declined due to lack of preparation time, and FIBA Asia instead invited the United Arab Emirates to replace them. After the United Arab Emirates declined the invitation for the same reason, and FIBA's confirmed the Lebanese federation's suspension, FIBA Asia decided not to invite any other team, reducing the total number of teams to 15. This left Group B with only three teams, and some games were moved from the Ninoy Aquino Stadium to compensate for the lost games involving Lebanon.

This meant all Group B teams thus automatically qualified for the second round, regardless of the outcome of their first round matches.

Venues 
The Mall of Asia Arena (MOA Arena) was chosen as the main venue for the championship, while the Ninoy Aquino Stadium served as the second venue for the tournament. Treston College Gym, the University of Makati Gym, the Makati Coliseum and the Cuneta Astrodome were the designated practice venues.

Draw
The draw was held at the Centennial Ballroom of the Manila Hotel on June 6. Unlike earlier championships where the draw favored stronger teams, FIBA Asia mandated that it will be a "pure draw", or the teams were not seeded, with the host country (the Philippines) picking 13th. At the time of the draw, two participants from the SEABA region were yet to be determined and were designated as "Southeast Asia 1" and "Southeast Asia 2". A separate draw would later be held to determine which teams would be designated as "Southeast Asia 1" and "Southeast Asia 2".

Squads

Each team has a roster of twelve players. Only one naturalized player per team is allowed by FIBA.

Tournament format
Preliminary round: Three groups of four teams and a group of three teams. Teams from the same group play against each other once. Teams are ranked by points awarded in descending order. Top three advance to the second round.
Group tournament ranking system:
Games won: 2 points
Games lost by ordinary circumstances: 1 point
Games lost by default: 1 point, and the score at the time of stoppage if the defaulting team is trailing, or a score of 2–0 if it is leading or if the game is tied.
Games lost by forfeit: 0 points and a score of 20–0 against the forfeiting team.
Tiebreaking criteria:
Game results between tied teams via points system above
Goal average between games of the tied teams
Goal average for all games of the tied teams
Drawing of lots
Second round: Groups A and B shall comprise Group E, while Groups C and D shall comprise Group F. Teams play against teams that have not played yet once, while the records for the teams that they had already met that also advanced are carried over. Same points and tiebreaking system as in the preliminary round. Top four advance to the final round.
Final round: Single-elimination tournament for the championship
3rd–4th classification: Playoff for semifinals losers
5th–8th classification: Single-elimination tournament for quarterfinals losers
9th–12th classification: Single-elimination tournament for fifth and sixth placers in the second round
13th–15th classification: Single-elimination tournament for fourth placers in the preliminary round.

Preliminary round

Group A

Group B

Group C

Group D

Classification 13th–15th

Second round

 The results and the points of the matches between the same teams that were already played during the preliminary round shall be taken into account for the second round.

Group E

Group F

Classification 9th–12th

Final round

Quarterfinals

5th–8th place semifinals

Semifinals

Seventh place game

FIfth place game

Third place game

Final

Final ranking

Awards

Most Valuable Player:   Hamed Haddadi
All-Star Team:
 PG –  Jayson Castro
SG –  Kim Min-goo
SF –  Lin Chih-chieh
PF –  Oshin Sahakian
C  –  Hamed Haddadi

Statistical leaders

Player tournament averages

Points

Rebounds

Assists

Steals

Blocks

Other statistical leaders

Team tournament averages

Points

Rebounds

Assists

Steals

Blocks

|}

Tournament game highs

Marketing

Broadcasting
FIBA announced that Chinese state broadcaster China Central Television (CCTV) earned the rights to broadcast FIBA events in China from 2013 to 2016, and that a record number of Asian broadcasters are to telecast the event. At least some matches were broadcast in 40 countries and territories all over the world.

These are the broadcasters from the participating teams:

In the Philippines, Solar Entertainment Corporation's Basketball TV is the official home broadcaster airing all matches from the Mall of Asia Arena. Solar has the rights to all FIBA telecasts in the Philippines until 2015. For free TV, ABC Development Corporation's flagship network, TV5, aired games involving the Philippines and the immediately preceding match, while AksyonTV aired the afternoon matches. BTV aired all games of the knockout round, while TV5 aired two quarterfinal games, the semifinals, third-place playoff and final, and AksyonTV aired a quarterfinal.

The TV5 airings of Philippines games were consistently among the top ten telecasts of the night throughout the tournament, and even beat shows from ABS-CBN and GMA in Mega Manila. According to Nielsen Media Research, TV5's Mega Manila audience share on 10 August was 33.1%, as against GMA's 30.1% and ABS-CBN's 24.3%; numbers for 11 August improved, with TV's 38.1% beating GMA's 31.5% and ABS-CBN's 18.3%. National audience share showed TV5 winning with a 35.3% share, or about 5.7 million people, against 28.1% of GMA and 25% of ABS-CBN.

Soundtrack
There were 2 main soundtracks made for the Asian Championship, which was heard over in Philippine TV Broadcast.
 Saludo  by Quest
 Gilas Anthem/Puso by JR Ponce Enrile

Officials

Match commissioners
 Riel Banaria 
 Jaafar Ali Ghuloom
 Ip Fuk-Wah
 Xin Ping

Referees

 Abdulkarim Shakeeb
 Peng Ling
 Wang Xiao Chun
 Wang Mei
 Cheung Kwok Shun Andy
 Chen Ying-Cheng
 Atanu Banerjee
 Snehal Bendke
 Amirhossein Safarzadeh
 Yuri Hirahara
 Toru Katayose
 Mohd Naser Abu Rashed
 Arsen Andryushkin
 Yevgeniy Mikheyev
 Shin Gi-rok
 Chong Yun Aun
 Tan Chin Siong
 Ferdinand Pascual
 Ricor Buaron
 Glenn Cornelio
 Jassim Abdullah
 Yasser Abbas
 Hatim Alharbi
 Thongchai Thaweewutsophon
 Harja Jaladri
 Mohd Al-Amiri

Sponsorship
 Bodog Asia
 Peak
 Smart Communications

References 

 
2013–14 in Asian basketball
2013–14 in Philippine basketball
2013
International basketball competitions hosted by the Philippines
Sports in Manila
August 2013 sports events in the Philippines